VSG may refer to:

 Laminated safety glass (German: Verbundsicherheitsglas), a type of glass that holds together when shattered.
 Variable surface glycoprotein, a protein coating the surface of some infectious microorganisms (e.g. Trypanosoma brucei) and helping them to evade the host's immune system
 VDM Verlagsservicegesellschaft, a subsidiary of the German publishing group VDM Publishing
 Venetian Most Serene Government, a Venetian political organization.
 Verilog Standards Group, the body that develops and maintains the Verilog HDL
 Vermont State Guard, the state defense force of Vermont
 Vertical sleeve gastrectomy, a bariatric surgical technique
 Victoria Scout Group, one of the two Scout Groups in Victoria Institution, a school in Kuala Lumpur, Malaysia
 Video Store Girl, one of the pseudonyms of Valerie D'Orazio, a popular comic book editor and writer
 VSG Altglienicke Berlin, a German sports club
 VSG, the Visualization Sciences Group, developers of Open Inventor and Avizo, popular 3D visualization software packages.
 VSG, IATA airport designator of the Luhansk International Airport, Luhansk, Ukraine
 VSG, ICAO airline designator of AirClass Airways (formerly Visig Operaciones Aéreas), Las Palmas de Gran Canaria, Canary Islands, Spain
 Xylene Blue VSG, another name for the colorant brilliant blue FCF (E133)